Tencalla is a surname. Notable people with the surname include:
 Carpoforo Tencalla (1623–1685), Swiss-Italian Baroque painter
 Costante Tencalla (1593–1646), Swiss-Italian architect and sculptor
  (1629–1702), Swiss architect